United States competed at the 2009 World Championships in Athletics in Berlin. A team of over 100 athletes was announced in preparation for the competition. Team USA athletes honoured Jesse Owens' memory by displaying the letters JO on their competition singlets. Selected athletes achieved one of the competition's qualifying standards. The squad included reigning champions, such as: Tyson Gay, Allyson Felix, Michelle Perry, Reese Hoffa, Dwight Phillips, Brad Walker, Bernard Lagat, Kerron Clement, and Jeremy Wariner. Furthermore, outside the reigning champions, there were a number of past medallists and world leaders in the squad. With such strength in depth in a large squad, the United States was expected to maintain its dominance of the competition, in which it has not been beaten on total gold medals since 1987. Olympic champion Bryan Clay missed the competition due to injury.

The United States team again topped the medals table; its total of 10 gold medals was almost equal to that of second and third place's totals combined.

Team selection

Track and road events

Field and combined events

References

External links
Official competition website

Nations at the 2009 World Championships in Athletics
World Championships in Athletics
2009